There are two towns named Saligrama in the Indian state of Karnataka:
Saligrama, Mysore
Saligrama, Udupi